Bucculatrix tsurubamella is a moth in the family Bucculatricidae. It was described by Shigeki Kobayashi, Toshiya Hirowatari and Hiroshi Kuroko in 2010. It is found on Honshu, the main island of Japan.

The wingspan is 6–7 mm. The forewings are white, with some orange or light orange-brown streaks. The hindwings are grey.

The larvae feed on Quercus acutissima. They mine the leaves of their host plant. The young larvae form a linear or sometimes serpentine mine. Pupation takes place in an ocherous-white cocoon.

Etymology
The species name is derived from the Japanese name of the host plant (tsurubami).

References

Natural History Museum Lepidoptera generic names catalog

Bucculatricidae
Moths described in 2010
Moths of Japan